Family Resemblances is a 1996 French comedy film. It was directed by Cédric Klapisch, and written by Klapisch, Agnès Jaoui and Jean-Pierre Bacri. The film stars Bacri, Jaoui, Jean-Pierre Darroussin, Catherine Frot, Wladimir Yordanoff, Claire Maurier and Zinedine Soualem.

It won the César Award for Best Writing, Best Supporting Actor, and Best Supporting Actress.

Plot 
An average French family ostensibly celebrates a birthday in a restaurant. In one evening and during one meal, family history, tensions, collective and separate grudges, delights, and memories both clash and coalesce. Indeed, poking each other's sore spots turns out to be the main order of business. Henri (Bacri) runs a saloon that he inherited from his father called "The Even Tempered Dad," and in the near-empty bar, he plays host to several members of the family as they mark the 35th birthday of his sister-in-law, Yolande (Frot). Henri's sister, Betty (Jaoui), is 30, single, and not very happy about it; his brother (and Yolande's husband), Philippe (Yordanoff), is an executive in a growing software company; Mother (Maurier) is the siblings' strong-willed matriarch; and Henri's paralyzed dog is on hand, whom someone describes as "like a rug, but alive." It's not been a good day for most of them: Philippe is anxious that his boss might not have liked the tie he wore on television; Betty is depressed about the sad state of her current relationship; Henri has just learned that his wife is leaving him; and Mother is tossing caustic barbs at everyone left and right. Henri's bartender Denis (Darroussin) is the one neutral party on hand, and he provides the voice of reason in the midst of the bickering.

Cast 
 Jean-Pierre Bacri as Henri Ménard
 Jean-Pierre Darroussin as Denis
 Catherine Frot as Yolande Ménard
 Agnès Jaoui as Betty Ménard
 Claire Maurier as Mother
 Wladimir Yordanoff as Philippe Ménard
 Cédric Klapisch as Father in 1967
 Antoine Chappey as A neighbour 
 Zinedine Soualem as A consumer
 Sophie Simon as Mother in 1967

Awards and nominations 
César Awards (France)
Won: Best Actor – Supporting Role (Jean-Pierre Darroussin)
Won: Best Actress – Supporting Role (Catherine Frot)
Won: Best Writing (Jean-Pierre Bacri, Agnès Jaoui and Cédric Klapisch)
Nominated: Best Actress – Supporting Role (Agnès Jaoui)
Nominated: Best Director (Cédric Klapisch)
Nominated: Best Film
Gardanne Film Festival (France)
Won: Audience Award	(Cédric Klapisch)
Lumières Award (France)
Won: Best Director	(Cédric Klapisch)
Won: Best Screenplay (Cédric Klapisch, Jean-Pierre Bacri and Agnès Jaoui)
Montréal Film Festival (Canada)
Won: Public Prize	(Cédric Klapisch)
Won: Special Grand Prize of the Jury (Cédric Klapisch; tied with Sleeping Man (Nemuru otoko))

References

External links 
 

1996 films
Films directed by Cédric Klapisch
Films featuring a Best Supporting Actor César Award-winning performance
Films featuring a Best Supporting Actress César Award-winning performance
French comedy films
Films whose director won the Best Director Lumières Award
1990s French-language films
1990s French films
1996 comedy films